Brightbay Real Estate Partners is a property investment business. It was listed on the London Stock Exchange as RDI REIT PLC, ticker symbol RDI. In May 2021, Starwood Capital Group acquired RDI REIT plc for £467.9M and it was reformed into Brightbay Real Estate Partners and remains a fully integrated Real Estate Investment Trust.

History
The company was established in 2002 as the Corovest International Real Estate Fund. It was floated on the Alternative Investment Market  in 2006. It changed its name to Redefine International in 2008 and converted to a Real estate investment trust listed on the London Stock Exchange in 2013. It changed its name again, to RDI REIT, in November 2017.

Operations

The company's largest investments include the  Grand Arcade in Wigan, St George's Shopping Centre in Harrow and West Orchards Shopping Centre in Coventry. The company had a portfolio valued at £1.5bn as at 31 August 2017.

Portfolio

References

External links
Official site

Real estate companies established in 2002
Companies listed on the Johannesburg Stock Exchange